Ormesby a village in North Yorkshire, England. Its governance is split between two unitary authority boroughs, to the north Middlesbrough and to the south Redcar and Cleveland, both are part of the devolved Tees Valley area. It is in the Middlesbrough part of the Teesside built up area.

Spencer Beck to the east and the B1380 road to the south form the boundary of Redcar and Cleveland with Middlesbrough's borough. The Ormesby ward, including Overfields and Ormesby Hall, had a population of 5,942 at the 2011 census. The Park End and Beckfield ward, which also includes Priestfields and Netherfields, is the area of Ormesby in borough of Middlesbrough.

History
Ormesby manor and church are recorded in the Domesday Book of 1086 as the property of 'Orme', to whose name the suffix  (derived from a Viking word for habitation or dwelling place) was added to make Ormesby.

Its east and west boundaries were defined by the becks, Spencer Beck and Ormesby Beck – beck being the Old Norse word for stream (coming from the same root as the word "beach") and is still used present day Northern England. A Middle Beck ran parallel to the others, through the middle of the village and along Church Lane, dividing the manor into two strips of land of roughly the same size.

The village itself was likely centred on Church Lane, being part of the ancient road that linked the River Tees to Guisborough and Stokesley.

In medieval times, a substantial part of the manor was granted to Gisborough Priory. At this time, a grange, also known as a 'priory farm', was established in the general location of the existing Grange Farm and Ormesby Hall. It is possible, therefore, that the grange farmhouse may have occupied the site of the 17th-century house built by the Pennymans and now incorporated into the present Ormesby Hall.

The records from Gisborough Priory suggest that the grange was accompanied by a settlement consisting of two rows of properties facing each other across Church Lane.

A surviving remnant of the original Ormesby village is the High Street's 18th-century Sundial Row, a terrace of ex-almshouses and stables which are now private houses. Alongside the almshouses is a betting shop which was once a school, it bears the inscription:

These buildings, together with the Grade I listed National Trust property, Ormesby Hall form the centrepieces to a conservation area.

1900s
Miss Elizabeth Caroline Brown, who died in 1905, was a noted local benefactor and paid for the erection of a number of buildings in Ormesby including Ormesby House and the now demolished Ormesby School. 

Ormesby Hall estate built a row of three brick and tile cottages, where numbers 2–6 Church Lane are now located, at the beginning of the 20th century. Some thirty years later, to mark the Silver Jubilee of King George V in 1935, Colonel Pennyman pulled down the old Black Lion Inn and the cottages on Church Lane to erected Jubilee Bank.

Jubilee Bank was created as a row of twenty-eight estate workers' cottages to replace the four previous buildings. Architects, Kitching & Co of Middlesbrough, designed both rows in the fashionable Arts and Crafts vernacular style. A row of four cottages, opposite Ormesby House, were demolished in the 1960s. Mudd's Cottage, currently numbered 38, and the old Vicarage (now known as Hambleton House) still survive.

Landmarks

Queen Victoria's Diamond Jubilee Memorial

Ormesby Hall

The manor of Ormesby was acquired by the Pennyman family when they bought up lands formerly owned by Gisborough Priory. As soon as the first parcel of land was acquired, in about 1600, they set about building what would have been little more than a large farmhouse and was probably on the site of the medieval grange buildings. More of the surrounding land was bought until the family owned the whole manor of Ormesby.

They had to sell the land's eastern half in 1715, only to buy it again in 1771 and sold it again to a John Brown of Liverpool. This subdivision of the estate inevitably influenced the way in which Ormesby developed over the next 200 years. With some of the Ormesby manor changing hands, more than once, a second house was built by the new owners, in the 1700s.

From the Victorian period the park was used by the Pennyman family, as well as the local community, for sports, with cricket and football in the summer (the cricket pitch remains) and golf in the winter months.  Horticultural shows, garden fetes and political rallies followed. The Hall was, from 1664 until 1852, the seat of the Pennyman of Ormesby baronetcy.

Today, Ormesby Hall, is open to the public. The stable block housed the horses of the  Cleveland Police Mounted Section, until it was disbanded in 2013.

Ormesby House
 
Rebuilding on the former 18th century Ormesby Manor House's site, a new Ormesby Manor House was built in 1904 by its owner, Miss Elizabeth Caroline Brown. The architect, Fred Rowntree, designed the detached house in a Jacobethan style with red brick, concrete dressings and to be set back into its gardens. It is probable that the subterranean remains of the house survive under the early 20th century house.

Governance

Until 1866 ancient parish of Ormesby had the manors of Eston, Morton, Normanby and Upsall. Each became separate civil parishes, the manors of Ormesby and Ormesby Grange merged into a single Ormesby civil parish.

Religion

Throughout the 19th century, Ormesby underwent many changes. Only minor alterations and extensions were carried out to Ormesby Hall, but the adjacent St Cuthbert's Parish Church was largely rebuilt.  This took place between 1875 and 1907 to designs in the Decorated style by architects W. S. & W.L. Hicks.  The new building incorporated the Anglo Saxon foundations, carved work and re-dressed masonry from the 12th-century church.

In 1883 the attractive oak lych-gate was added to the Church Lane entrance to the churchyard. Elizabeth Brown paid for the erection of the church's tower, spire and her own cast-iron railed (grade II listed) churchyard monument.

Schools
Schools in Ormesby are: Ormesby Primary School, St Gabriel's RC Primary School, Overfields Primary School, Pennyman Primary School and Outwood Academy Ormesby.

Gallery

See also
 Normanby Hall
 Ormesby Hall

References

External links

Areas within Middlesbrough
Places in the Tees Valley
Redcar and Cleveland
Greater Eston
Unparished areas in North Yorkshire